The National Institute Economic Review is a British economics academic journal that is published quarterly by SAGE Publications on behalf of the National Institute of Economic and Social Research.  The journal principally focuses on modelling and analysis, education economics, productivity, and international economics.  Each issue incorporates an overarching theme, in addition to topical commentary and forecasts.

Abstracting and indexing 
The National Institute Economic Review is abstracted and indexed in:
 British Humanities Index
 Business Source Premier
 Current Contents/Social and Behavioral Sciences
 Inspec
 Social Science Abstracts
 Social Sciences Citation Index

References

External links 
 

Economics journals
English-language journals
Publications established in 1959
Quarterly journals
SAGE Publishing academic journals